The 2018 Budapest GP3 Series round was the fifth round of the 2018 GP3 Series. It was held on 28 and 29 July 2018 at Hungaroring in Mogyoród, Hungary. The race supported the 2018 Hungarian Grand Prix.

Classification

Qualifying

Feature race

Sprint race

Notes

References

|- style="text-align:center"
|width="35%"|Previous race:
|width="30%"|GP3 Series2018 season
|width="40%"|Next race:

Budapest
Budapest GP3
Budapest GP3